The 2000 United States presidential election in Wisconsin took place on November 7, 2000, and was part of the 2000 United States presidential election. Voters chose 11 representatives, or electors to the Electoral College, who voted for president and vice president.

Wisconsin was won by Vice President Al Gore by a slim 0.22% margin of victory, a mere difference of 5,708 votes. This was the first time since 1988, and only the second time since 1960 that Wisconsin did not vote for the overall winner of a presidential election. This was the last time that Wisconsin voted to the right of neighboring Iowa.

Wisconsin was won by a narrow margin by Gore by less than 6,000 votes.  Gore carried Milwaukee County home of Milwaukee, and Dane County home of Madison, which contributed to his victory.

Results

By Congressional District
Gore won 5 of the 9 congressional districts.  Both candidates won a district held by the opposite party.

By county

Counties that flipped from Democratic to Republican
Barron (Largest city: Rice Lake)
Brown (Largest city: Green Bay)
Burnett (Largest city: Grantsburg)
Chippewa (Largest city: Chippewa Falls)
Clark (Largest city: Neillsville)
Door (Largest city: Sturgeon Bay)
Forest (Largest city: Crandon)
Iron (Largest city: Hurley)
Jefferson (Largest city: Watertown)
Juneau (Largest city: Mauston)
Kewaunee (Largest city: Algoma)
Langlade (Largest city: Antigo)
Lincoln (Largest city: Merrill)
Manitowoc (Largest city: Manitowoc)
Marathon (Largest city: Wausau)
Marinette (Largest city: Marinette)
Marquette (Largest city: Montello)
Monroe (Largest city: Sparta)
Oconto (Largest city: Oconto)
Oneida (Largest city: Rhinelander)
Outagamie (Largest city: Appleton)
Polk (Largest city: Amery)
Price (Largest city: Park Falls)
Racine (Largest city: Racine)
Richland (Largest city: Richland Center)
Rusk (Largest city: Ladysmith)
Sawyer (Largest city: Hayward)
Shawano (Largest city: Shawano)
Sheboygan (Largest city: Sheboygan)
St. Croix (Largest city: Hudson)
Taylor (Largest city: Medford)
Washburn (Largest city: Spooner)
Waushara (Largest city: Berlin)
Winnebago (Largest city: Oshkosh)
Wood (Largest city: Marshfield)

Electors

The electors of each state and the District of Columbia met on December 18, 2000 to cast their votes for president and vice president. The Electoral College itself never meets as one body. Instead the electors from each state and the District of Columbia met in their respective capitols.

The following were the members of the Electoral College from the state. All were pledged to and voted for Al Gore and Joe Lieberman:
Alice Clausing
Pedro Colon
Paulette Copeland
Reynolds Honold
Joan Kaeding
Mark McQuate
Ruth Miner-Kessel
Christine Sinicki
Tim Sullivan
Angela Sutkiewicz
Charlie Wolden

See also
 United States presidential elections in Wisconsin

References

Wisconsin
2000
Presidential